Liam Joseph Rose (born 7 April 1997) is an Australian footballer who plays as a defensive midfielder for USL Championship club El Paso Locomotive.

Career
Rose was educated at Bossley Park High School.

Central Coast Mariners
Rose was signed alongside fellow AIS scholarship holder Anthony Kalik on full senior contracts by then Central Coast Mariners' coach Graham Arnold. He made his professional A-League debut as a second-half substitute in a 2–1 win over Adelaide United on 7 February 2015. On 18 April 2018, following the end of his contract, Central Coast Mariners announced that Rose's contact would not be renewed.

Ararat-Armenia
Following his release from the Mariners, Rose moved to Armenia to play for FC Ararat-Armenia.

Sydney United 58
In 2019, Rose returned to Australia and joined Sydney United 58 FC.

Macarthur FC
Rose featured in a friendly match for new A-League club Macarthur FC on 25 October 2020 where he scored a first-half goal against  NPL NSW4 club Camden Tigers. The following day, the club announced they had signed Rose.

El Paso Locomotive
On May 16, 2022, El Paso Locomotive FC announced Rose's signing for the remainder of the 2022 USL Championship season.

Career statistics

Club

Honours

Country
Australia
 AFF U-19 Youth Championship: 2016

Individual
 Mariners Medal: 2015–16

References

External links
 Liam Rose profile CCMariners.com.au

1997 births
Living people
Association football midfielders
Australian soccer players
National Premier Leagues players
Central Coast Mariners FC players
Central Coast Mariners Academy players
FC Ararat-Armenia players
Sydney United 58 FC players
Macarthur FC players
El Paso Locomotive FC players
A-League Men players
Australian expatriate sportspeople in Armenia
Expatriate footballers in Armenia
Australian expatriate soccer players
USL Championship players